Ron Dewar is a jazz tenor saxophone player in the Chicago area. He has toured and recorded with many well-known musicians, including Elvis Presley, Clark Terry, Sarah Vaughan, and Louis Bellson. In the 1970s, Dewar was the leader of the traditional jazz band The Memphis Nighthawks. Memphis Nighthawks recordings include the albums Jazz Lips on Delmark Records and Live at the Stabilizer.

Career
Dewar began his career at the University of Illinois at Urbana-Champaign in the late 1950s and early 1960s. Ron was a featured soloist the U of I Big Band led by John Garvey which travelled to the USSR on a State Department sponsored tour. Musical associations from that time include trumpeter/composer Jim Knaap, drummers Charlie Brougham and Joel Spencer, bassist Kelly Sill, pianist/composer Jim McNeely, cornetist Guy Senese, Cecil, Ron, and Dee Dee Bridgewater,  pianists Denny Zeitlin and Donny Heitler, trumpeter Art Davis, drummer George Marsh, saxophonist Ed Petersen and many more.

In the 1970s, while playing with traditional jazz players in Chicago such as Doc Kittrell (trumpet) and Roy Rubenstein (trombone), Ron developed a passion for the music of New Orleans. He studied the New Orleans clarinetists Omer Simeon, Johnny Dodds, Barney Bigard and Sydney Bechet and incorporated their styles in his playing, sometimes even playing an older style Albert system clarinet. He delved deeply in the recordings of Jelly Roll Morton and the early King Oliver sides with Louis Armstrong on second cornet. He arranged many of these tunes for the Memphis Nighthawks and inspired many other players to pursue this music.

In the eighties, Ron and drummer Phil Gratteau, joined Brazilian artists Breno and Neusa Sauer and Paulinho Garcia in a Chicago group called Made in Brazil. In 1984 they recorded "Tudo Joia" for Pausa records, a blend of contemporary bossa and samba with a jazz flavor.

Dewar may also be heard as soloist on recordings such as "In a Mellow Tone" with the Thomas Gunther Trio and as an ensemble member on recordings by modern composer-conductor Salvatore Martirano. He is currently active as player and teacher in the Chicago area.

External links
Ron Dewar Info Site
Salvatore Martriano "O, O, O, O That Shakespeherian Rag"  

Living people
Year of birth missing (living people)
American jazz tenor saxophonists
American male saxophonists
University of Illinois Urbana-Champaign faculty
21st-century American saxophonists
21st-century American male musicians
American male jazz musicians